Molfsee is an Amt ("collective municipality") in the district of Rendsburg-Eckernförde, in Schleswig-Holstein, Germany. The seat of the Amt is in Molfsee.

The Amt Molfsee consists of the following municipalities:

Blumenthal 
Mielkendorf 
Molfsee
Rodenbek
Rumohr 
Schierensee

References

Ämter in Schleswig-Holstein